ABC Watermark was a radio syndication entity that existed from 1982 until 1995.

History
The company came to be as the result of ABC Radio Networks' purchase of Watermark Inc. from its founders Tom Rounds and Ron Jacobs. The acquisition gave ABC control of Watermark's two major syndication properties, the Casey Kasem and Don Bustany creations American Top 40 and American Country Countdown. ABC would later launch another show under the American brand, the oldies-themed American Gold, in 1991.

Current status
Watermark ceased to exist after the cancellation of American Top 40 in 1995; it would later be revived by Kasem in 1998 and is currently distributed by Premiere Radio Networks. American Country Countdown has aired continuously since its premiere and continues to be distributed by ABC successor Cumulus Media, now under the Nash FM brand (it is now hosted by Kix Brooks; longtime host Bob Kingsley hosted the identically formatted Country Top 40) from New Year's weekend 2005/2006 until shortly before his death on Thursday, October 17, 2019.  American Gold ended in 2009, with host Dick Bartley now hosting the similarly formatted Classic Countdown for United Stations Radio Networks.

References
Durkee, Rob. American Top 40: The Countdown of the Century. Schriner Books, New York City, 1999. .

1982 establishments in the United States
Mass media companies established in 1982
Defunct mass media companies of the United States
American Top 40
Mass media companies disestablished in 1995
1995 disestablishments in the United States 
Radio stations established in 1982 
Radio stations disestablished in 1995
Defunct radio stations in the United States